Ashcroft may refer to:

Places
 Ashcroft, British Columbia, a village in Canada
Ashcroft House in Bagpath, Gloucestershire, England—eponym of the Canadian village
 Ashcroft, New South Wales, a suburb of Sydney, Australia
 Ashcroft, Colorado, a former U.S. mining town, south of Aspen
 Ashcroft (Geneva, New York), a historic house
 Ashcroft Technology Academy, a secondary school in London, UK

People
 Catherine Ashcroft, English musician (Irish Folk)
 Charlie Ashcroft, English footballer
 Chloe Ashcroft, British television presenter
 Christina Ashcroft (born 1964), Canadian sport shooter
 Dolores Ashcroft-Nowicki, British occultist
 Edgar Arthur Ashcroft (1864–1938), invented zinc extraction process in Australia
 Ernest Ashcroft (b. 1925), English professional rugby league footballer 
 Lee Ashcroft, English footballer
 Lee Ashcroft (footballer, born 1993), Scottish footballer
 Jay Ashcroft, American politician
 Jimmy Ashcroft, English footballer
 John Ashcroft, the 79th Attorney General of the United States under George W. Bush (2001–2005)
 Ken Ashcroft, Australian rugby league footballer
 Marcus Ashcroft, Australian rules footballer
 Michael Arbuthnot Ashcroft, British codebreaker in Hut 8 during WW2
 Michael Ashcroft, Baron Ashcroft, British businessman and member of the House of Lords
 Neil Ashcroft (1938–2021), condensed matter physicist
 Peggy Ashcroft, English actress
 Ray Ashcroft, English actor
 Richard Ashcroft, English musician, frontman for The Verve
 Stella Ashcroft (born 2002), New Zealand gymnast
 William Ashcroft, English artist

See also 
 Ascroft, a surname